Tamisha Akbar (born April 17, 1970) better and professionally known as Tami Roman, is an American television personality, model, businesswoman and actress. Roman first gained fame on The Real World: Los Angeles in 1993. After making cameo appearances and starring in supporting roles in various television shows and films in the 1990s and 2000s, Roman became one of the breakout stars of VH1's Basketball Wives.

Career
During her time on The Real World: Los Angeles, Roman formed her own R&B girl group quartet called Reality. Roman herself was one of the four members and the rapper of the group as well. During the same time, the group signed a record contract with Mercury Records. The name of the song was "Prisoner Of Your Love," but the producer that worked with them was, from what Tami stated, was very difficult to work with, to please, and hard to satisfy. The group ended their collaboration with him and the song was never recorded. In 1994 while still under contract with Mercury Records, Roman changed the group's name from Reality to Female. The group was offered the opportunity to join other African-American girl groups in recording the remake of R&B singer Joi's song "Freedom" for the motion picture soundtrack album, Panther.

The song featured other R&B girl groups such as En Vogue, SWV, TLC, For Real, Xscape, Brownstone, Y?N-Vee, Changing Faces and several other groups.  The song also featured many female African-American solo artists and female rappers. The second song the group was in on that soundtrack was a cover version of the hit song If I Were Your Woman by Gladys Knight and the Pips, only the group was the backing vocals while solo artist, Shanice was the lead vocal. The third and final song that Female was heard in on the soundtrack was also a cover version the legendary soul hit (You Make Me Feel Like) A Natural Woman by Aretha Franklin. The names of the other three girls in the group were Monique Johnson, Donyell Floyd, and Carlett Martin. After the soundtrack, not much else was heard from the group again and they never released an album.

Roman gained more fame as she appeared as the dealer on the 2001 revival of Card Sharks, and on several other shows, including an episode of One on One (season 3, episode 4) and BET’s original tv series, “the Parker’s”, as Dina (season 1, episode 14). In 2010, Roman became one of the main cast members in the VH1 reality series Basketball Wives. She was then cast on the Basketball Wives spinoff Basketball Wives LA, starting with the fourth season in 2015. Roman appeared on two episodes of the CBS show Extant. Roman could also be heard on Tami Roman's Love Talk & Hot Jamz with advice columnist and rapper Willie D of the Geto Boys and Reggie Youngblood. The show aired on Houston's KCOH Radio. Roman and her boyfriend Reggie Youngblood appeared on Marriage Boot Camp: Reality Stars for its 3rd season, which premiered May 29, 2015. Roman is working on her hair and cosmetic lines.

After Roman released a series of videos titled "Bonnet Chronicles" on Instagram, it was produced into a scripted series on TIDAL in 2018.

Personal life 
Roman has been married twice and has two children. On August 26, 1993, Roman married NBA player Kenny Anderson and together they had two daughters, Lyric Chanel (b. 1994) and Jazz Anderson (b. 1996). Roman and Anderson later divorced in February 2001. Roman has been married to Reggie Youngblood since August 2018.

Filmography

Film

Television

See also
List of Puerto Ricans

References

External links

Tami Roman Twitter

1970 births
Living people
The Real World (TV series) cast members
Actors from Mount Vernon, New York
People from White Plains, New York
Actresses from New York (state)
Female models from New York (state)
American actresses of Puerto Rican descent
Basketball players' wives and girlfriends
American film actresses
American television actresses
20th-century American actresses
21st-century American actresses